The Rea River is a river in Fiordland, New Zealand. It rises west of Teardrop Lake and flows into Misty River before it enters Kaikiekie / Bradshaw Sound.

See also
List of rivers of New Zealand

References

Rivers of Fiordland